Jochen Reimer (born September 6, 1985) is a German former professional ice hockey goaltender who played in the Deutsche Eishockey Liga (DEL). He previously played with the Thomas Sabo Ice Tigers after a second tenure with EHC München from Grizzly Adams Wolfsburg on April 20, 2011.

After three seasons with the Ice Tigers, Reimer left as a free agent to sign a one-year deal in splitting the starting duties with Timo Pielmeier at ERC Ingolstadt on May 31, 2017.

On November 6, 2020, Reimer announced his retirement from professional hockey after 14 seasons.

He participated at the 2011 IIHF World Championship as a member of the Germany men's national ice hockey team.

References

External links

1985 births
Living people
DEG Metro Stars players
German ice hockey goaltenders
ERC Ingolstadt players
EHC München players
Thomas Sabo Ice Tigers players
Grizzlys Wolfsburg players
People from Mindelheim
Sportspeople from Swabia (Bavaria)